Okina Kyogoku ( (京極 おきな, Kyōgoku Okina, born 20 October 2001) is a Japanese competitor in synchronised swimming. She competed at the 2020 Summer Olympics, in the team event with Yukiko Inui.

Career 
She participated in the  2018 Asian Games, and 2019 World Aquatics Championships.

References

External links 
 
 JPN - Japan, FUKUMURA Juka INUI Yukiko, KIJIMA Moeka KYOGOKU Okina, TSUKAMOTO Mayu YANAGISAWA Akane, YASUNAGA Mashiro YOSHIDA Megumu Gwangju South Korea 17/07/2019 Artistic Swimming Team Free Preliminaries 

2001 births
Living people
Japanese synchronized swimmers
Synchronized swimmers at the 2020 Summer Olympics
Olympic synchronized swimmers of Japan
Asian Games medalists in artistic swimming
Artistic swimmers at the 2018 Asian Games
Asian Games silver medalists for Japan
Medalists at the 2018 Asian Games